Jojobera Power Plant is a coal-based thermal power plant located at  Jojobera, near Jamshedpur, East Singhbhum district in the Indian state of Jharkhand. The power plant is owned by Tata Power.

Capacity
It has an installed capacity of 547.5 MW (1x67.5 MW, 4x120 MW).

The plant has been supplying power to Tata Steel.

References

External links

 Jojobera Power Plant unit 5 at SourceWatch

Coal-fired power stations in Jharkhand
East Singhbhum district
Tata Power
Year of establishment missing